The 2020–21 season was the Manitoba Junior Hockey League's (MJHL) 104th year of operation.  The league was unable to complete the season for the second consecutive year due to the COVID-19 pandemic.

Season notes
The Winnipeg Freeze join the MJHL, bringing the league back to twelve teams for the first time since the St. James Canadians folded after the 2002–03 season.
Kevin Saurette succeeds Kim Davis as commissioner.
COVID-19 pandemic measures:
The league adopts a three division format with each team scheduled to play forty games instead of the customary sixty. Standings are based on winning percentage instead of points earned.
All showcase events are cancelled.
The league suspends play on November 12, 2020 due to provincial health orders requiring the shutdown of all public sporting events.  The remainder of the season and playoffs are officially cancelled on February 12, 2021.  
Hockey Canada and the Canadian Junior Hockey League cancel the 2021 ANAVET and Centennial Cups for the second consecutive year.

Standings
Standings when play halted on November 12, 2020:

References

External links
 MJHL Website
 2020-21 MJHL season at HockeyDB.com

Manitoba Junior Hockey League seasons
MJHL
MJHL